Charles Balfour Marcus Fenton  (17 January 1912 – 12 June 2009) was an Australian politician.

He was born in Smithton. In 1957 he was elected to the Tasmanian Legislative Council as the independent member for Russell, succeeding his uncle Arthur Fenton. He was Chair of Committees from 1971 to 1972 and President of the Council from 1972 to his retirement in 1981. On 3 December 1975 he was appointed to the Executive Council to commemorate the 150th anniversary of its first sitting.

References

1912 births
2009 deaths
Independent members of the Parliament of Tasmania
Members of the Tasmanian Legislative Council
Companions of the Order of Australia
Presidents of the Tasmanian Legislative Council
20th-century Australian politicians